Diego Gallo González (born June 28, 1982) is a backstroke swimmer from Uruguay, who competed at the 2000 Summer Olympics for his native country.

At the 2000 Olympics, he set the Uruguay Record in the 100 backstroke at 58.18.

References
 Terra

1982 births
Living people
Olympic swimmers of Uruguay
Male backstroke swimmers
Swimmers at the 1999 Pan American Games
Swimmers at the 2000 Summer Olympics
Pan American Games competitors for Uruguay
Uruguayan male swimmers
20th-century Uruguayan people
21st-century Uruguayan people